Pima fergusoni is a species of snout moth. It is found in North America, including Oregon and California.

References

Moths described in 2003
Moths of North America
Phycitini
Pima (moth)